Taqsis (also known as Zawr az Ziyarah is a village in northern Syria, administratively part of the Hama Governorate, located south of Hama. Nearby localities include al-Jinan to the north, al-Buraq to the northwest, Tell Qartal to the west, Ghor al-Assi to the southwest, Izz al-Din to the southeast and Taldarah to the east. According to the Central Bureau of Statistics (CBS), Taqsis had a population of 3,343 in the 2004 census.

During early Ottoman rule, in 1573, a water installation was built in the area of Taqsis. It consisted of an aqueduct and a tower, alongside which were two noria (na'ura) wheels. It was built in the typical style of old dams along the Orontes River. The norias no longer exist and the dam is mostly in ruins, although the remainder of the structure is in relatively good condition.

Taqsis had been abandoned sometime in the last years of the 18th-century, and in 1838 the village was classified as a khirba ("abandoned village"). However, towards the end of Khedivate Egyptian rule (1832-1841), Taqsis was among 20 villages along the edge of the Syrian Desert to be repopulated. While most of these small, agricultural places were abandoned during the 1840s due to the pressures of warring nomadic tribes, Taqsis remained occupied.

References

Bibliography

 

Populated places in Hama District